William Izett Buchanan (born May 8, 1972) is an American former professional basketball player.

Early life
Buchanan hails from Goshen, New York and attended Goshen Central High School. He graduated in 1990 having scored 1,344 points during his high school career.

College
Buchanan then went on to play basketball at Marist College from 1990 to 1995. During his four-year career he scored 1,593 points, including a school single game-record 51 against Long Island during the 1993–94 season. That same year, he set a season record with 645 points en route to being named the Northeast Conference Men's Basketball Player of the Year He also shared the Haggerty Award with Artūras Karnišovas of Seton Hall. Sports Illustrated named him their national player of the week for that effort. He finished his Marist career in the top 10 of other major statistical categories, including career steals (137), rebounds (613), scoring average (16.6), free throws made (390).

Off-court incident
In April of his senior year, Buchanan was charged in Poughkeepsie, New York with spending more than $1,000 in credit cards he allegedly stole. This did not affect his NCAA eligibility or cause any repercussion for him with the Marist basketball program.

Professional
Buchanan has been a journeyman in his professional career, playing for myriad teams in different countries:

1995–96: EBBC Den Bosch (Netherlands)
1996: BK Ventspils (Latvia)
1996–97: Hapoel Givataim (Israel, Leumit A)
1997: San Juan (Puerto Rico)
1997: Los Angeles Clippers veterans' camp
1997–98: Hapoel Givataim (Israel, Leumit A)
1998–99: Hapoel Tel Aviv (Israel, Leumit A)
1999: Signed with Andino La Rioja (Argentina)
1999: Gaiteros de Zulia (Venezuela)
1999–2000: Maccabi Karmiel (Israel, Leumit A)
2000: ACMT Pro Camp in Columbus, Ohio
2000–01: Maccabi Ashdod (Israel, Leumit A)
2001: Cocodrilos de Caracas (Venezuela)
2002: Goias / Universo / Ajax (Brazil)
2002: Shanshi YuJing (China, Summer League)
2002–03: Antranik Beirut (Lebanon)
2003: Club Central (Lebanon)
2003: Trotamundos de Carabobo (Venezuela, LPB)
2003 Global Summer League in Iraklio (Greece, Ergofit team)
2003: Henan Hong Li (China)
2003: Invited to Atlanta Hawks camp
2004: Paris Racing (France, ProA)
2004: Clermont Ferrand (France, ProB)

References

1972 births
Living people
American expatriate basketball people in Argentina
American expatriate basketball people in Brazil
American expatriate basketball people in China
American expatriate basketball people in France
American expatriate basketball people in Greece
American expatriate basketball people in Israel
American expatriate basketball people in Lebanon
American expatriate basketball people in the Netherlands
American expatriate basketball people in Venezuela
American men's basketball players
Basketball players from New York (state)
Cocodrilos de Caracas players
Gaiteros del Zulia players
Marist Red Foxes men's basketball players
Paris Racing Basket players
People from Goshen, New York
Heroes Den Bosch players
Point guards
Shooting guards
Small forwards
Sportspeople from the New York metropolitan area
Trotamundos B.B.C. players